Iain Brunnschweiler (born 10 December 1979) is an English former professional cricketer, and semi-professional footballer. As a right-handed batsman and wicket-keeper he played first-class cricket for Hampshire between 2000 and 2003. He played football for AFC Totton between 2005 and 2007.

Starting his career in 1998, he first played in the Minor Counties Trophy for the Hampshire Cricket Board, before signing a professional contract with Hampshire in 1999. In 2000, he made his first class debut in a match against a New Zealand A side touring England for six weeks in June–July. In July 2001 he hit the winning runs against Steve Waugh's touring Australia at the Rose Bowl in Hampshire. He made his Championship debut against Yorkshire in 2003 at Scarborough, scoring 34 in the first innings and sharing a partnership of 73 with Simon Katich.

Brunnschweiler was the assistant and fitness coach at Hampshire until November 2011, when he left the Rose Bowl to take up a development role with England. As part of his role he has been appointed head coach of the England Under-16s and 17s along with coaching the England Under-19s.

Brunnschweiler has authored two published books on the subject of coaching cricket. The Inspired Cricket Manual - Practice Like the Pros and The Inspired Cricket Manual 2 - Practice with Purpose.

As of November 2017, Brunnschweiler works for Southampton Football Club in the role of Coach & Player Development Manager, based at the club's training ground in Marchwood.

Outside cricket
Brunnschweiler played for AFC Totton as a goalkeeper, with whom he reached the FA Vase final in 2007, losing 3–1 to Truro City at the new Wembley Stadium in front of a crowd of 36,232.

References

External links
Iain Brunnschweiler at ESPNcricinfo
Iain Brunnschweiler at CricketArchive

1979 births
Living people
Cricketers from Southampton
English cricketers
Hampshire cricketers
Hampshire Cricket Board cricketers
English cricket coaches
English footballers
A.F.C. Totton players
Brockenhurst F.C. players
Association football goalkeepers
Southampton F.C. non-playing staff
Wicket-keepers